Robert, Rob, or Bob Roberts may refer to:

People

Politicians
Robert H. Roberts (1837–1888), New York politician
Robert W. Roberts (1784–1865), U.S. Representative from Mississippi
Robert Roberts (Queensland politician) (1869–1934), Australian politician for East Toowoomba between 1912 and 1934
Bob Roberts (Australian politician) (born 1952), Member of the New South Wales Legislative Assembly
Robert Roberts (American politician) (1848–1939), mayor of Burlington, Vermont
Rob Roberts (politician) (born 1979), Welsh Member of Parliament

Sportsmen
Bob Roberts (footballer, born 1859) (1859–1929), West Bromwich Albion F.C. and England international football goalkeeper
Robert Mills-Roberts (1862–1935), Preston North End F.C. and Wales international football goalkeeper
Bob Roberts (footballer, born 1863) (1863–1950), Wrexham A.F.C. and Wales international footballer
Robert Roberts (footballer, born 1864) (1864–1932), Bolton Wanderers F.C., Preston North End F.C. and Wales international footballer
Robert Roberts (footballer, born 1865) (1865–1945), Rhosllanerchrugog, Crewe Alexandra F.C. and Wales international footballer
Robert Lee Roberts (1868–1943), Chester F.C. and Wales international footballer
Robert Roberts (footballer, born 1892) (1892–?), Manchester United F.C. footballer
Robert Roberts (rugby league) (1912–1979), rugby league footballer of the 1930s and 1940s
Rob Roberts (rugby league) (born 1978), Welsh rugby league player of the 1990s, 2000s and 2010s
Bob Roberts (Australian footballer) (born 1930), former Australian rules footballer

Other
Robert Roberts (cardiologist), Canadian cardiologist
Robert Roberts (priest) (1680–1741), Welsh cleric and writer
Robert Richford Roberts (1778–1843), American Methodist bishop
Robert Roberts (butler) (1780–1860), author of The House Servant's Directory: A Monitor for Private Families
Robert Roberts (Christadelphian) (1839–1898), Scottish journalist, writer and preacher
Robert Roberts (author) (1905–1974), British author of The Classic Slum
Bob Roberts (singer) (1871–1930), American vaudeville singer and recording artist
Bob Roberts (folksinger) (1907–1982), British musician, sailor, journalist and author
R. Silyn Roberts (1871–1930), Welsh-language author
Bob Roberts (cinematographer), American cinematographer of Argentine cinema
Robert Campbell Roberts (born 1942), American philosopher
Robert Davies Roberts (1851–1911), Welsh academic and educational administrator

Other
Bob Roberts, a 1992 film written and directed by and starring Tim Robbins

See also
Bobby Roberts (disambiguation)
List of people with reduplicated names